Phytojacobsonia is a genus of mites in the family Laelapidae.

Species
 Phytojacobsonia irregularis Vitzthum, 1925

References

Laelapidae